Route 62 is a bus route that operates in the United Kingdom between Lichfield and Cannock. It is operated by Chaserider.

History 
The route was formerly operated by Arriva Midlands North.

In February 2022, Chaserider announced that it would withdraw the Saturday service and some late afternoon journeys due to low passenger numbers, starting on 20 February. The route was later proposed for complete withdrawal, however, in May 2022 it was announced that it would be retained. It was noted that the service was running at a loss and that it would still be withdrawn if passenger numbers didn't increase. The Saturday service was restored from 12 November 2022 with funding from a housing developer. The route was revised to run through the new housing estate.

Route 
The route runs hourly. It runs from Lichfield to Cannock via Rawnsley.

References 

Bus routes in England
Transport in Staffordshire
Lichfield
Cannock